Pastria is a genus of skippers in the family Hesperiidae.

Species
Pastria albimedia (Joicey & Talbot, 1917)
Pastria grinpela Parsons, 1986
Pastria pastria Evans, 1949

External links
Natural History Museum Lepidoptera genus database
Notes on some skippers of the Taractrocera-group (Lepidoptera: Hesperiidae: Hesperiinae) from New Guinea
Pastria at funet

Taractrocerini
Hesperiidae genera